Byron Dragway is a ¼-mile (402-meter) dragstrip located in Byron, Illinois, United States, about 1.5 hours from Chicago (84 miles, 134 km straight-line distance). Although the track is ¼-mile, it has timing for both ¼-mile and ⅛-mile classes.

The dragway was opened in the 1960s, and at first it ran cars four abreast. However, that practice was discontinued. For that reason, Byron is a comparatively wide track. It is currently best known as the site of the World Power Wheel Standing Championships.

Owner: Kevin Robertson

Byron Dragway is an NHRA track as of April, 2011. 

Home Track of IHRA 2006 Summit Super Series No Box Champion John Coyle

External links
Byron Dragway 

IHRA drag racing venues
Motorsport venues in Illinois
Buildings and structures in Ogle County, Illinois
Tourist attractions in Ogle County, Illinois